Sarmientola is a Neotropical genus of skippers in the subfamily Eudaminae.

Species
Sarmientola almeidai (Mielke, 1967)
Sarmientola browni (Mielke, 1967)
Sarmientola dinka (Evans, 1952)
Sarmientola eriopis (Hewitson, 1867)
Sarmientola faustinus (Burmeister, 1878)
Sarmientola haywardi (Mielke, 1967)
Sarmientola phaselis (Hewitson, 1867)
Sarmientola similis (Mielke, 1967)

References

External links
 Images representing Sarmientoia at Consortium for the Barcode of Life

Hesperiidae
Hesperiidae of South America
Butterfly genera